Fermanagh County Council was the authority responsible for local government in County Fermanagh, Northern Ireland, between 1899 and 1973. It was originally based at the Enniskillen Courthouse, but moved to County Buildings in East Bridge Street, Enniskillen, in 1960.

History
Fermanagh County Council was formed under orders issued in accordance with the Local Government (Ireland) Act 1898 which came into effect on 18 April 1899. Elections were held using proportional representation until 1922 when it was abolished in favour of first past the post. In 1921, shortly before the partition of Ireland and transfer of power from the Dublin Castle administration, Fermanagh County Council passed a resolution on a 13–10 majority not to recognise the newly formed Parliament of Northern Ireland and pledged their allegiance to the unrecognised republican Second Dáil of the self-proclaimed Irish Republic in Southern Ireland before the ratification of the Anglo-Irish Treaty. The resolution stated: "We, the County Council of Fermanagh, in view of the expressed desire of a large majority of people in this county, do not recognise the partition parliament in Belfast and do hereby direct our Secretary to hold no further communications with either Belfast or British Local Government Departments, and we pledge our allegiance to Dáil Éireann." In response, the Royal Irish Constabulary evicted them from their council offices and confiscated official documents. As a result, the council was temporarily dissolved. The council were replaced by Commissioners appointed by Sir Dawson Bates.

The council was reformed by the time of the 1924 Northern Ireland local elections. As a protest against the abolition of proportional representation nationalist parties boycotted the election, allowing unionist parties to take control of the council uncontested. Due to the abolition of proportional representation and gerrymandering, the council always had a unionist majority of councillors elected up until abolition. In 1967, the Government of Northern Ireland passed the County Fermanagh (Transfer of Functions) Order 1967. This made Fermanagh County Council amalgamate with the smaller Enniskillen Borough Council and the rural district councils in Enniskillen, Irvinestown and Lisnaskea to turn Fermanagh County Council into a unitary authority.

Later years and abolition 
In 1969, the Fermanagh Civil Rights Association published a booklet criticising the council and accusing them of favouring the Protestant community over the Catholic community. Some of the accusations included that the council would deliberately hire Protestants for skilled local government and school jobs and that they proposed to build a new village for Catholics in a gerrymandered district that already had a Catholic majority. The council was abolished in accordance with the Local Government Act (Northern Ireland) 1972 on 1 October 1973 and replaced by Fermanagh District Council.

See also
 Armorial of Ireland

References

County councils of Northern Ireland
1899 establishments in Ireland
1973 disestablishments in Northern Ireland